Brown Eye, Evil Eye (also known as Smedje Oko Zlo Oko) is a 1967 film starring Hugh Griffith, Rosemary Nicols, Ron Thompson and directed by Robert Angus.

Plot
The story of the strange friendship between a seventy-year-old man and a six-year-old girl.

References

External links 

1967 films
1967 drama films
Serbian-language films
Films shot in Serbia